Beautiful Thugger Girls is the fifth commercial mixtape by American rapper Young Thug. It was released on June 16, 2017, by 300 Entertainment and Atlantic Records. The mixtape features guest appearances from Millie Go Lightly, Gunna, Future, Quavo, Snoop Dogg, Lil Durk, and Jacquees. Production on the mixtape was handled by Billboard Hitmakers, Charlie Handsome, London, Rex Kudo, and Wheezy, among others.

Beautiful Thugger Girls received widespread acclaim from critics, and debuted at number eight on the US Billboard 200. It also debuted at number four on the US Top R&B/Hip-Hop Albums.

Background
On April 26, 2017, Young Thug originally announced that the project would be titled E.B.B.T.G., an abbreviation for Easy Breezy Beautiful Thugger Girls, which was a play on "easy, breezy, beautiful CoverGirl" as the slogan for CoverGirl. After several delays, the release date was hinted a week before release and officially confirmed two days before release. Beautiful Thugger Girls was described by Young Thug as a "singing album", which includes crossovers to musical genres such as R&B, dancehall and country. Although it has been referred to as an album by Young Thug, 300 Entertainment have reported it as a commercial mixtape.

Critical reception

Beautiful Thugger Girls was met with widespread critical acclaim. At Metacritic, which assigns a normalized rating out of 100 to reviews from mainstream publications, the mixtape received an average score of 84, based on eight reviews. Aggregator AnyDecentMusic? gave it 7.8 out of 10, based on their assessment of the critical consensus.

Paul Thompson of Pitchfork labelled Beautiful Thugger Girls Young Thug's "most compelling experiment in pop", saying it "strips away all the clutter, leaving his best-developed melodies and most evocative songwriting to date" while comparing it to Lil Wayne's Rebirth. Scott Glaysher of XXL said, "Thug sounds the best he's ever sounded, despite some of the songs begin [sic] fairly far removed from his proverbial comfort zone". Daniel Bromfield of Pretty Much Amazing argued "Young Thug cycles through a lot of styles here: lovebird R&B, sensitive acoustic folk, even country. But he doesn't terraform them to his whims so much as try them on for size". Judnick Maynard of The Fader commented that Beautiful Thugger Girls "becomes more than a country album: the music isn't his master, instead he bends it to his will", and is a "testament to Young Thug's constantly evolving creative reach". Tiny Mix Tapess Corrigan B stated: "Beautiful Thugger Girls is remarkable because of its Thugger-ness" but noted that "Beautiful Thugger Girls marks the point at which his pure lyricism, absent an unimpeachable sense of melody and flow, has begun to detract from the project as a whole."

The A.V. Clubs Renatio Pagnani stated: "Few artists manage to balance wide-eyed eroticism with genuine warmth, and fewer manage the feat while packing multiple albums' worth of hooks into each song. For Thug, it's just his default mode." Winston Cook-Wilson of Spin said, "The album feels unprecedented within his catalog because it strikes a balance Thug has never quite pulled off on a single project: mixing a unified, album-wide sound with moments of aggressive experimentation and nagging hooks". Exclaim! critic Anya Zoledziowski thought that "Beautiful Thugger Girls—which lists Drake as executive producer—pushes the boundaries of Atlanta hip-hop while adding yet another groundbreaking project to the trapper's discography".

Robert Christgau was less impressed in his column for Vice. While highlighting "Take Care" and "Family Don't Matter", he summarized the mixtape as "singsong porn from a purple people eater who's seldom as funny as he used to be and sometimes funnier than he wants to be".

Year-end lists

Commercial performance
Beautiful Thugger Girls debuted at number eight on the US Billboard 200 and number four on the US Top R&B/Hip-Hop Albums with 37,000 album-equivalent units of which 7,000 were pure album sales in its first week of release. On December 6, 2019, the album was certified gold by the Recording Industry Association of America (RIAA) for combined sales and album-equivalent units of over 500,000 units in the United States.

Track listing

Notes
 The vinyl version of "Me or Us" features a guest appearance by Travis Scott.

Samples
 "Me or Us" contains a sample from "First Day of My Life", written by Conor Oberst, and performed by Bright Eyes.
 "Take Care" contains a sample from "I Got You (I Feel Good)", written and performed by James Brown.

Personnel
Credits adapted from the album's liner notes.

Performers
 Young Thug – vocals
 Millie Go Lightly – vocals (tracks 1, 3)
 Future – vocals (track 6)
 Quavo – vocals (track 7)
 Snoop Dogg – vocals (track 9)
 Lil Durk – vocals (track 9)
 Jacquees – vocals (track 13)

Technical
 Kesha Lee – record engineering (tracks 1, 6)
 Zeke Mishanec – record engineering (track 2)
 Dread – record engineering (tracks 3, 9, 14)
 Sean Riggins – record engineering (tracks 4, 5, 13)
 Bricks – record engineering (track 7)
 Drop – record engineering (track 8)
 Alex Tumay – mix engineering (all tracks), recording engineer (tracks 10, 11)
 Joe LaPorta – master engineering (all tracks)

Production
 Wheezy – production (tracks 1, 8, 10, 12)
 Rex Kudo – production (tracks 1–3, 11)
 Ben Billions – production (track 2)
 Charlie Handsome – production (tracks 3, 8, 11)
 London – production (tracks 4, 5)
 Scott Storch – production (track 4)
 Billboard Hitmakers – production (tracks 6, 13)
 BLSSD – production (track 6)
 Young Chop – production (track 9)
 Post Malone – production (track 11)
 Judge – production (track 14)

Additional personnel
 Brian  Ranney – project production
 Virgilio Tzaj – art direction and design
 Garfield Larmond – photography

Charts

Weekly charts

Year-end charts

Certifications

Release history

References

Young Thug albums
Atlantic Records albums
Albums produced by London on da Track
Albums produced by Scott Storch
Albums produced by Young Chop
2017 mixtape albums